St. Joe, Illinois is a small unincorporated community in the historic New Design Precinct of Monroe County, Illinois, United States. It is located along the historic road from Kaskaskia to St. Louis, between Renault and Burksville.

Unincorporated communities in Monroe County, Illinois
Unincorporated communities in Illinois
Metro East